Idrottsföreningen Kamraterna Göteborg, commonly known as IFK Göteborg, is a Swedish professional football club based in Gothenburg. The club have participated in 32 editions of the club competitions governed by UEFA, the chief authority for football across Europe. These include 15 seasons in the European Cup and Champions League, 14 seasons in the UEFA Cup and Europa League, two seasons in the Cup Winners' Cup and one season in the Intertoto Cup. IFK Göteborg is the only Swedish club to have won a UEFA governed competition, as the club won the UEFA Cup in 1982 and 1987. The International Federation of Football History & Statistics ranks IFK Göteborg as the 32nd most successful European club, and the most successful Nordic club, of the 20th century. Counting all of the 164 games the side have played in UEFA competitions since their first entry into the European Cup in the 1958–59 season, the team's record stands at 73 wins, 34 draws and 57 defeats.

Key

Overall record

By competition 
The following list details IFK Göteborg's record per UEFA tournament. Statistics include goals scored during extra time where applicable; in these games, the result given is the result at the end of extra time. The result of games decided after a penalty shoot-out is given as result at the end of extra time.

By opponent club nationality 
The following list details IFK Göteborg's record totaled by the nationality of the clubs they have played in UEFA tournaments. The nationality is given as the club nationality at the time the game was played, and not as the current nationality of the club. Statistics include goals scored during extra time where applicable; in these games, the result given is the result at the end of extra time. The result of games decided after a penalty shoot-out is given as result at the end of extra time.

By club 
The following list details IFK Göteborg's record against clubs they have played three or more times in UEFA tournaments. Statistics include goals scored during extra time where applicable; in these games, the result given is the result at the end of extra time. The result of games decided after a penalty shoot-out is given as result at the end of extra time.

Matches

European Champion Clubs' Cup/UEFA Champions League

UEFA Cup/UEFA Europa League

European Cup Winners' Cup/UEFA Cup Winners' Cup

UEFA Intertoto Cup

Footnotes

Citations

References 

Books

Web pages, news, and articles

Europe
Swedish football clubs in international competitions